WHYM (1260 AM) is an American radio station licensed to serve Lake City, South Carolina. The station is currently owned by Community Broadcasters, LLC. The station currently simulcasts WFRK, a news/talk station known as "Live 95".

Programming
Syndicated talk show hosts formerly on WHYM included Glenn Beck, Dennis Miller, Fred Thompson, and Alan Colmes. Sports coverage included Fox Sports Radio, the weekday morning Press Box with Allen Smothers and University of South Carolina sports. Fox News Radio airs each hour.

History
The station signed on in 1953 as WJOT and aired a variety of local programming.

Then the station shared some of its programming with adult standards radio station WOLS (later WTIX, now WOLH). The slogan used by this station was "We Have Your Music".

At one point WHYM was Christian radio.

GHB Broadcasting sold WTIX and WHYM to Estuardo Rodriguez in 2006. WHYM then aired a Regional Mexican music format called Radio Fiesta along with what was once again WOLS.

Miller Communications, Inc. bought WOLH and WHYM in 2008. The switch to the urban oldies format was made in 2009.

On March 1, 2013, WHYM changed their format to sports, with programming from ESPN Radio. WHYM simulcast WOLH in Florence SC, also heard on W255BD in Darlington.

Miller Communications sold WHYM, eleven other South Carolina radio stations, and several translators to Community Broadcasters, LLC for $2.5 million, in a transaction that was consummated on January 7, 2016.

References

External links

HYM